Isaac Newton Kwaku Wuaku (29 December 1946 – 3 April 2020) was a Ghanaian barrister and a judge. He was a retired Justice of the Supreme Court of Ghana.

Early life and education
Wuaku hailed from Peki in the Volta Region of Ghana. He was born at Peki, Dzake on 29 December 1926. His mother was Madam Irene Abena Kuma Drah, the second wife of Mr. Agodzo Kofi Wuaku, a renowned carpenter/farmer from the Lemenyigbe Clan of Peki, Avetile. He was the first of four children from the marriage. He had his secondary education at Mfantsipim School, Cape Coast in the 1940s. He later proceeded to University College London for his tertiary education. He completed his law studies at the Middle Temple in 1957 and consequently became Peki's first lawyer.

Career
Wuaku worked at Opoku Akyeampong and Company as a private legal practitioner. After the dissolution of the partnership, Wuaku established his own practice in Ho. As a token of gratitude to his cousin and mentor, Mr. Seth Elewosi Kwame Wuaku, Wuaku conducted his practice under the name Elewosi Chambers. He was later called to bench and served in Cape Coast and Sunyani prior to his elevation to the Appeals Court bench. He was later appointed Justice of the Supreme Court of Ghana. After his retirement he was appointed by the then president John Agyekum Kufuor to chair a three-man committee to investigate the Yendi crisis.

See also
List of judges of the Supreme Court of Ghana
Supreme Court of Ghana

References

1926 births
2020 deaths
Justices of the Supreme Court of Ghana
Mfantsipim School alumni
20th-century Ghanaian judges
Alumni of the University of London
New Patriotic Party politicians
People from Volta Region
21st-century Ghanaian judges